Chocolaterie Stam is a trademark and name of three or four Dutch chocolate companies in the Netherlands and the Midwestern United States.

References

External links
Chocolaterie Stam, Des Moines

Dutch chocolate companies